Campuzano is a surname. Notable people with the surname include:

Ashley Campuzano (born 1992), American actress
Carmen Campuzano (born 1970), Mexican actress and model
Daniela Campuzano (born 1986), Mexican mountain biker
Juan Carlos Campuzano, American physicist
Jorman  Campuzano, Colombian football player
Rómulo Campuzano (born 1957), Mexican politician
Rosa Campuzano (1796–1851)
Will Campuzano (born 1986), Mexican-American mixed martial artist

See also
Campusano

Spanish-language surnames